The 2008–09 British Columbia pipeline bombings were a series of bombs that targeted gas pipelines owned by EnCana near the towns of Dawson Creek and Tomslake, British Columbia. The first blast occurred on October 12, 2008 and the second overnight between October 15 and October 16. The third was discovered on October 31 and a fourth was reported on January 5, 2009. The attacks brought to question the safety of the energy installations in Canada.

Timeline 

On October 31, 2008 letters were sent to local media outlets warning oil and gas companies to leave the area saying: "We will no longer negotiate with terrorists which you are as you keep endangering our families with crazy expansion of deadly gas wells in our home lands". The Royal Canadian Mounted Police warned the companies; however no further action was taken.

On October 12 an explosion occurred on a sour gas pipeline to the east of Dawson Creek British Columbia. The explosion left a 2.5 meter and 2 meter deep crater but did not rupture the pipeline. Had the explosion ruptured the pipeline, toxic gases would most likely have been released. The RCMP sent a specialized team to investigate the explosion four days later.

On October 16 a second blast hit a natural gas pipeline. Workers discovered the blast site at approximately 10:00 a.m. MT off of British Columbia Highway 2. This explosion also did not rupture the pipeline but left a crater in the ground. Following the explosion the Integrated National Security Enforcement Team (INSET) were called in to assist in the investigation of the explosion.

The following day RCMP called a press conference to state that they believe the public is safe despite admitting that it would be very difficult to protect the large expanse of pipeline in the area.

On October 24 police arrested a person in Alberta they believe may have had something to do with the blasts.

On October 31, a third bomb detonated at a natural gas wellhead in the region of Dawson Creek (12 kilometers northwest of Tomslake). Encana reported minimal damage.

On January 5, 2009 a fourth blast destroyed a metering shed near the community of Tomslake.

Investigation 

The RCMP was quick to try to convince the public that they believed the bombings were not an act of terrorism and simply an act of sabotage by one person or group. On October 17 RCMP spokesman Sgt. Tim Shields released the following statement: "We believe someone or a group of people have set two deliberate explosions that were intended to rupture and blow up a natural-gas pipeline".

It has also been suggested that the bombings may be associated with the growing annoyance amongst the agricultural community of having pipelines crisscrossing the land. Wiebo Ludwig was arrested in connection with the pipeline bombings on January 8, 2010. He was previously convicted in 2001 of similar bombings which targeted oil and gas pipelines. After an extensive search of his farm by the Royal Canadian Mounted Police, he was released without charge.

References 

Pipeline bombings
Pipeline bombings
Eco-terrorism
Dawson Creek
Terrorist incidents in North America in 2008
Terrorist incidents in North America in 2009
2008 crimes in Canada
2009 crimes in Canada
Terrorist incidents in Canada in the 2000s